Citiservi is an internet marketplace launched in May 2009, inspired by yellow pages. The platform allows service providers and consumers to find each other and compare quotes. Its main markets are USA and Spain however, versions are available for Mexico, Brazil and other countries.

History
Citiservi was founded in late 2008. The Spanish website was launched in May 2009. In September of the same year, Citiservi launched local versions for Italy and UK. In 2010, Citiservi launched Mexico and US local websites.

Citiservi won the EIBT national Award in February 2012.

In November 2012, Citiservi and Spanish insurer MAPFRE signed an agreement intended to help bring new customers to its client companies.

In late 2012, Citiservi partnered with Feebbo to conduct the first edition of SMBs perspectives for the next year. Over 1000 small business owners were polled on questions about their perspectives for year 2013. The survey found that 71% of the business will invest in online advertising during 2013 and 42% do not use any CRM software and do not run any loyalty program with their customers.

In 2013, Citiservi created Citiservi USA Inc and opened its first US office in Philadelphia (PA).

References

External links
 US Official website
Internet properties established in 2008
Privately held companies based in Pennsylvania